Arugot, is a moshav in southern Israel. Located near Kiryat Malakhi, it falls under the jurisdiction of Be'er Tuvia Regional Council.

History
The moshav was founded in 1949 by Jewish immigrants from Poland and Romania on the land belonging to the depopulated Palestinian village of Qastina. Its name was taken from the Book of Ezekiel .

References

Moshavim
Populated places established in 1949
Populated places in Southern District (Israel)
1949 establishments in Israel
Polish-Jewish culture in Israel
Romanian-Jewish culture in Israel